"Dark as a Dungeon" is a song written by singer-songwriter Merle Travis. It is a lament about the danger and drudgery of being a coal miner in a shaft mine.  It has become a rallying song among miners seeking improved working conditions.

The song achieved much of its fame when it was performed by Johnny Cash in his Folsom Prison concert (At Folsom Prison). During this live performance, one of the prisoners in the background was laughing, and Cash started to chuckle. He gently admonished the man, "No laughing during the song, please!" The man yelled something about "Hell!" and Cash answered, "I know, 'hell'!" When he finished the song, Cash made a comment that was largely repeated, somewhat out of context, by Joaquin Phoenix in the 2005 film Walk the Line: "I just wanted to tell you that this show is being recorded for an album released on Columbia Records, so you can't say 'hell' or 'shit' or anything like that."

Recorded versions

 Merle Travis on Folk Songs of the Hills, 1946
 Maddox Brothers and Rose, 1950
 Cisco Houston, Early 1950s
 Tennessee Ernie Ford, (1955)
 Harry Belafonte on "The Many Moods of Belafonte" (1962)
 Gordon Lightfoot and Terry Whelan on Two Tones at the Village Corner, 1962
 Grandpa Jones, 1963
The Big 3, 1963
 Johnny Cash, studio version as the b-side of "Understand Your Man" single (1964)
 Wolfe Tones on "Foggy Dew" -as "Down in the Mines" (1965)
 The Twiliters on "In Concert" (1966)
 Johnny Cash, live version on "At Folsom Prison" (1968)
 Merle Travis with The Nitty Gritty Dirt Band on Will the Circle Be Unbroken (1972)
 Peter Grudzien on The Garden Of Love
 Dolly Parton on 9 to 5 and Odd Jobs (1980)
 The Weavers on Together Again (1980)
 The Spinners on In our Liverpool Home as "Lure of the Mines" (1983)
 Patrick Sky, 1985
 Wall of Voodoo on Seven Days in Sammystown (1985)
 The Seldom Scene with Charlie Waller on 15th Anniversary Celebration (1988)
 Frank Tovey on Tyranny and the Hired Hand (1989)
 Souled American on Sonny (1992)
 Ramblin' Jack Elliott, duet with Guy Clark, on Friends of Mine (1998)
 The Chieftains with Vince Gill on Down the Old Plank Road: The Nashville Sessions (2002)
 Marley's Ghost on Ghost Country (1996)
 Queens of the Stone Age, 2005 
 Mark Linkous (recording as Sparklehorse) MOJO Magazine Tribute CD to Johnny Cash (2006)
 Charlie Louvin on Sings Murder Ballads and Disaster Songs (2008)
 Kathy Mattea on Coal (2008)
 Willie Nelson on Country Music (2010)
 Amy Grant on the Lee C. Camp & Friends specialty album, Tokens 9: "Back to Green" (2010) 
 Maddox Brothers and Rose 1950
 John Darnielle of The Mountain Goats on The Front Porch Sessions (The Front Porch Festival, 2012)
 Slobberbone recorded a version of Dark as a dungeon in 1998 on the Your excuse EP
 The Journeymen on Coming Attraction - Live (1962)
 Brock Zeman on "songs from the mud" (2004)
 The Rebel on Krot (2014)
 Fret! on the "Killing Nico EP" (2016)
 John Cowan (2000)  Self-titled CD for Sugar Hill Records
 John Mellencamp (2017)
 Heather Pierson Acoustic Trio (2017) on Singin'''
Bob Dylan on the archival release The Rolling Thunder Revue: The 1975 Live Recordings
Joni Mitchell on the archival release Joni Mitchell Archives – Vol. 1: The Early Years (1963–1967)'' (2020)

Published versions
 Rise Up Singing page 145

References

Johnny Cash songs
Merle Travis songs
Songs written by Merle Travis
1946 songs